Federació Andorrana de Natació (FAN) is the governing body of swimming in Andorra. It is a non-profit organization that was founded in 1985 on a meeting at the Andorran Olympic Committee. It is both a member of LEN and FINA.

References

External links
 Federació Andorrana de Natació (official website)

Andorra
Aquatics
1985 establishments in Andorra
Sports organizations established in 1985
Swimming in Andorra